Wilhelm Rudolf Ferdinand Bünger was a German politician and attorney who served as the Minister-President of Saxony from 1929 to 1930.

Biography 
Bünger was born on 8 October 1870 in Elsterwerda, Prussia, North German Confederation (present-day Brandenburg, Germany). He was a member of the German People's Party (DVP) from 1920 to 1930 while a member of the German Bundestag. From 1924 to 1927, Bünger was Minister of Justice, 1928 Minister of Education, and from 26 June 1929 to 18 February 1930, Minister-President of Saxony. He was married to Doris Hertwig-Bünger, also a state representative in Parliament, and lived with her in the Landhaus Carp Schampel, in the Saxon town of Radebeul. He died on 21 March 1937 in Leipzig, Saxony, Germany.

Bünger was the presiding judge at the Reichstag fire trial.

References 

1870 births
1937 deaths
People from Elsterwerda
Ministers-President of Saxony
German People's Party politicians